Yehuda  Getz (born 1924 in Tunis, Tunisia—died 17 September 1995 in Jerusalem) was the rabbi of the Western Wall  for 27 years.

Biography
Yehuda Meir Getz was born in Tunisia in 1924. He immigrated to Israel in 1949, settling in Kerem Ben Zimra, a moshav in Upper Galilee. He joined the Israel Defense Forces, rising to the rank of lieutenant-colonel.

Getz died of a heart attack on 17 September 1995.  He was survived by his wife and six children, and is buried on the Mount of Olives.

Rabbinic career 

After the death of his son Avner in the Six-Day War, he moved to Jerusalem's Old City.  Shortly afterwards he was appointed as overseer of prayers at the Western Wall.

Getz was a supporter of Excavations at the Temple Mount. In July 1981, Getz and a team of associates opened a tunnel under the Temple Mount near where he believed the Ark of the Covenant had been hidden in Solomon's Temple, directly below the Holy of Holies of the Second Temple.

References

1924 births
1995 deaths
People from Tunis
20th-century Tunisian rabbis
Israeli Orthodox rabbis
Tunisian emigrants to Israel
Western Wall
Burials at the Jewish cemetery on the Mount of Olives